Microsoft Windows XP Professional x64 Edition, released on April 25, 2005, is an edition of Windows XP for x86-64 personal computers. It is designed to use the expanded 64-bit memory address space provided by the x86-64 architecture.

The primary benefit of moving to 64-bit is the increase in the maximum allocatable random-access memory (RAM). 32-bit editions of Windows XP are limited to a total of 4 gigabytes. Although the theoretical memory limit of a 64-bit computer is about 16 exabytes (17.1 billion gigabytes), Windows XP x64 is limited to 128GB of physical memory and 16 terabytes of virtual memory.

Windows XP Professional x64 Edition uses the same kernel and code tree as Windows Server 2003 and is serviced by the same service packs. However, it includes client features of Windows XP such as System Restore, Windows Messenger, Fast User Switching, Welcome Screen, Security Center and games, which Windows Server 2003 does not have.

Windows XP Professional x64 Edition is not to be confused with Windows XP 64-Bit Edition as the latter was designed for Itanium architecture. During the initial development phases, Windows XP Professional x64 Edition was named Windows XP 64-Bit Edition for 64-Bit Extended Systems.

Advantages 
 Supports up to 128GB of RAM.
 Supports up to two physical CPUs (in separate physical sockets) and up to 64 logical processors (i.e. cores or threads on a single CPU). As such, the OS supports all commercially available multicore CPUs, including Intel Core series, or AMD FX series.
 Uses the Windows Server 2003 kernel which is newer than 32-bit Windows XP and has improvements to enhance scalability. Windows XP Professional x64 Edition also introduces Kernel Patch Protection (also known as PatchGuard) which can help improve security by helping to eliminate rootkits. 
 Supports GPT-partitioned disks for data volumes (but not bootable volumes) after SP1, which allows disks greater than 2TB to be used as a single GPT partition for storing data.
 Allows faster encoding of audio or video, higher performance video gaming and faster 3D rendering in software optimized for 64-bit hardware.
 Ships with Internet Information Services (IIS) version 6.0. All other 32-bit editions of Windows XP have IIS v5.1.
 Ships with Windows Media Player (WMP) version 10. Windows XP Professional shipped with WMP 8 (with WMP 9 shipping with Service Pack 2 and later), although WMP 11 is available for Windows XP Service Pack 2 or later.
 Benefits from IPsec features and improvements made in Windows Server 2003.
 Benefits from Shadow Copy features introduced in Windows Server 2003.
 Remote Desktop Services supports Unicode keyboard input, client-side time-zone redirection, GDI+ rendering primitives for improved performance, FIPS encryption, fallback printer driver, auto-reconnect and new Group Policy settings.
 Files and Settings Transfer Wizard supports migrating settings from both 32-bit and 64-bit Windows XP PCs.

Software compatibility 
Windows XP Professional x64 Edition uses a technology named Windows-on-Windows 64-bit (WoW64), which permits the execution of 32-bit software. It was first used in Windows XP 64-bit Edition (for Itanium architecture). Later, it was adopted for x64 editions of Windows XP and Windows Server 2003.

Since the x86-64 architecture includes hardware-level support for 32-bit instructions, WoW64 simply switches the process between 32- and 64-bit modes. As a result, x86-64 architecture microprocessors suffer no performance loss when executing 32-bit Windows applications. On the Itanium architecture, WoW64 was required to translate 32-bit x86 instructions into their 64-bit Itanium equivalents—which in some cases were implemented in quite different ways—so that the processor could execute them. All 32-bit processes are shown with *32 in the task manager, while 64-bit processes have no extra text present.

Although 32-bit applications can be run transparently, the mixing of the two types of code within the same process is not allowed. A 64-bit program cannot use a 32-bit dynamic-link library (DLL) and similarly a 32-bit program cannot use a 64-bit DLL. This may lead to the need for library developers to provide both 32-bit and 64-bit binary versions of their libraries. Specifically, 32-bit shell extensions for Windows Explorer fail to work with 64-bit Windows Explorer. Windows XP x64 Edition ships with both 32-bit and 64-bit versions of Windows Explorer. The 32-bit version can become the default Windows Shell. Windows XP x64 Edition also includes both 32-bit and 64-bit versions of Internet Explorer 6, so that user can still use browser extensions or ActiveX controls that are not available in 64-bit versions.

Only 64-bit drivers are supported in Windows XP x64 Edition, but 32-bit codecs are supported as long as the media player that uses them is 32-bit.

Installation of programs 

By default, 64-bit (x86-64) Windows programs are installed onto their own folders under folder location "C:\Program Files", while 32-bit (x86-32) Windows programs are installed onto their own folders under folder location "C:\Program Files (x86)".

Known limitations 
There are some limitations which apply to Windows XP Professional x64 Edition:

 NTVDM and Windows on Windows were removed, so 16-bit Windows applications or native MS-DOS applications cannot run. Some old 32-bit programs use 16-bit installers which do not run; however, replacements for 16-bit installers such as ACME Setup versions 2.6, 3.0, 3.01, 3.1 and InstallShield 5.x are hardcoded into WoW64 to mitigate this issue. The same is true with later 64-bit versions of Windows.
 Only 64-bit drivers are supported.
 Any 32-bit Windows Explorer shell extensions fail to work with 64-bit Windows Explorer. However, Windows XP x64 Edition also ships with a 32-bit Windows Explorer. It is possible to make it the default Windows Shell.
 Program Manager has been removed altogether. Previously, in Windows XP Service Pack 2, running the executable did not launch it, but it stored several old icons.
 Windows Command Prompt does not load in full-screen.
 No native support for Type 1 fonts.
 Media Bar, which replaced the Radio Toolbar in Internet Explorer 6, was removed.
 Does not contain a Web Extender Client component for Web Folders (WebDAV).
 Spell checking was removed from Outlook Express.
 IEEE 1394 (FireWire) audio is not supported.
 Does not support hibernation if PC's RAM is greater than 4GB.
 EFI or UEFI are not supported. An ACPI BIOS is required.
 Only provides English or Japanese as native display language. These MUIs are available for English version: Chinese, French, German, Italian, Japanese, Korean, Spanish, Swedish.

Service packs 
The RTM version of Windows XP Professional x64 Edition was built from the Windows Server 2003 Service Pack 1 codebase. Because Windows XP Professional x64 Edition comes from a different codebase than 32-bit Windows XP, its service packs are also developed separately. For the same reason, Service Pack 2 for Windows XP x64 Edition, released on March 13, 2007, is not the same as Service Pack 2 for 32-bit versions of Windows XP. In fact, due to the earlier release date of the 32-bit version, many of the key features introduced by Service Pack 2 for 32-bit (x86) editions of Windows XP were already present in the RTM version of its x64 counterpart. Service Pack 2 is the last released service pack for Windows XP Professional x64 Edition.

Upgrade 
A machine running Windows XP Professional x64 Edition cannot be directly upgraded to Windows Vista, because the 64 bit Vista DVD mistakenly recognizes XP x64 as a 32-bit system. XP x64 does qualify the customer to use an upgrade copy of Windows Vista or Windows 7, but it must be installed as a clean install.

The last version of Microsoft Office to be compatible with Windows XP Professional x64 Edition is Office 2007, and the last version of Internet Explorer compatible with the operating system is Internet Explorer 8 (Service Pack 2 is required).

References

Further reading

External links 

Windows XP
X86-64 operating systems

ca:Windows XP#64 bits